Rick Marlow Bockelie (28 May 1902 in Oslo – 18 February 1966 in Oslo) was a Norwegian sailor who competed in the 1924 Summer Olympics. In 1924 he won the gold medal as crew member of the Norwegian boat Bera in the 8 metre class event.

References

External links
profile

1902 births
1966 deaths
Norwegian male sailors (sport)
Olympic sailors of Norway
Sailors at the 1924 Summer Olympics – 8 Metre
Olympic gold medalists for Norway
Olympic medalists in sailing
Sportspeople from Oslo
Medalists at the 1924 Summer Olympics